The Battle of Maastricht was one of the first battles that took place during the German Campaign on the Western Front during World War II. Maastricht was a key city in order to capture the Belgian Fort Eben-Emael and split the allied armies in half.

Prelude
The German goal of the operation was to take the bridges over the river Maas intact, in order to have an easier road to France. Therefore, the Germans sent in teams disguised as civilians whose jobs were to sabotage the bridge charges. However, they were spotted and arrested, and when they attempted to run, shot.

Battle

The sluice complex at Borgharen—just north of Maastricht—was another waterworks that could not be destroyed. A section of infantry was stationed there. Close to the bridge, a casemate with a machine gun could assist. In the early morning hours, a patrol of six motorised infantrymen approached the eastern guard post. They were a reconnaissance party of the Hocke squad. They were ordered to stop, and four of them were taken prisoner. The other two were able to escape. The Dutch Lieutenant was confident that more would be coming, and he ordered his men to remain prepared. Not much later, more German soldiers appeared on motorcycles. The Dutch let them approach to within , then opened fire with two machine guns and every rifle available. The Germans temporarily retreated. However, when the Germans brought in reinforcements, the squad was overwhelmed. The defenders tried to draw back to the sluice. The move was difficult under ever-increasing German fire. The men at the sluice itself were able to resist the Germans, but the southeastern squad—which defended the northern entrance into Maastricht—had to give in when their machine gun failed. The gap that now existed in the outer defences of the city was soon penetrated by the majority of the Germans that had agitated against the sluice.

The 4. Panzerdivision encountered resistance around Gulpen, delaying them for hours. A column instructed to advance against Maastricht from the south was able to move forward faster. It appeared in front of the outer defences at Heugem. There, the barricades had been sealed and locked as instructed. The defending unit was ordered to move back behind the Maas once it become clear that the outer defences had been penetrated.

It was now up to the rearguard of the outer defences to slow down the German advance. The rearguard managed to destroy two armored cars and block the road for the remaining cars. When the German infantry had almost reached its position the commanding Dutch sergeant ordered an organised retreat. The squad safely reached the west bank of the Maas a little later.

By this time, only the railway bridge remained intact. The Germans felt that it could be a very useful crossing point for tanks, and only 35 Dutch soldiers defended it. As the Germans advanced to the bridge, they were briefly held off by the Dutch defenders. A few German soldiers were killed. However, the Dutch soon fell back because of overwhelming numbers. As the Germans began to cross the bridge, the charges were planted and the bridge fell into the river. After all of the bridges over the Maas River were destroyed, the only task that remained was to hold off the Germans as long as possible.

At the destroyed bridges in Maastricht, stray Dutch units continued piecemeal attacks on the Germans; the Dutch had spread over many strategic points, including a sniper squad in the towers of the bridge. When the Germans boldly placed an anti-tank gun in front of the bridge, aimed at the adjacent St. Servaasbrug, the Dutch instantly killed the crew. A new crew shared the same fate. A small number of rubber boats tried to cross the Maas but were shot to pieces. Then the Germans retreated from this location.

At the destroyed railway bridge, the heaviest fighting would be seen. What remained of the German squad that had tried to take the bridge was soon reinforced by the main German force. Two armored cars tried to approach the east bank but were destroyed by two anti-tank rifles. A light tank was also put out of action by the AT rifles. The German losses were high. However, soon after, three more German armored cars approached. The situation for the light Dutch infantry had become critical. Many defenders were killed or wounded by the German fire, and soon one of the two anti-tank rifles was destroyed. The headquarters were contacted to report the situation. From this contact, it became clear that the Dutch resistance at Maastricht had been ordered to cease.

Luitenant-Kolonel Govers, Territorial Commander (TC) of Limburg, had called a meeting later in the day. The German battle plans had been found on a German POW in the morning. All German units were mentioned in the plans and maps with directions had been part of the catch. It was clear that all bridges had been destroyed. It was also clear than an entire German tank division was deployed in southern Limburg. The TC had only two companies left under his command, without anti-tank guns or artillery. The ancient city of Maastricht, with all its cultural heritage, should not suffer more than necessary. The outcome of the meeting was that all further opposition to the Germans in and around Maastricht, the last standing defences in Limburg, would cease. The TC himself went to the Wilhelminabrug under a truce flag. Soon, contact was established. A few hours later, all Dutch troops in Maastricht and its surroundings capitulated.

Aftermath
The battle in South-Limburg (Sector Roosteren – Maastricht) had cost the lives of 47 Dutch soldiers (two officers, seven NCOs, 38 corporals and soldiers). The German losses are again not known in detail, although at some scenes accurate figures are available. It is estimated that between 130–190 Germans died due to the fighting in the south. After the battle, it was reported that 186 German bodies were found. It is confirmed from German material-states that nine armored cars and tanks were destroyed in Limburg. Also, 10 German aircraft—mainly Junkers Ju 52s and Ju 87s—crashed or were shot down in Zuid-Limburg.

See also 

 List of Dutch military equipment of World War II

 List of German military equipment of World War II

References

External links
Dutch history site
Timeline

May 1940 events
1940 in the Netherlands
Germany–Netherlands military relations
Battle of Belgium
Battles of World War II involving Germany
Battles and operations of World War II involving the Netherlands
Battles in Limburg (Netherlands)
Battle
Events in Maastricht